Tanysphyrus is a genus of beetles belonging to the family Brachyceridae.

The species of this genus are found in Europe, Japan and America.

Species:
 Tanysphyrus ater Blatchley, 1928 
 Tanysphyrus atra Blatchley, 1928 
 Tanysphyrus major Roelofs, 1874

References

Brachyceridae